Ingrid Wilm (born 8 June 1998) is a Canadian swimmer, specializing in the backstroke.

Career 
She competed in the women's 50 metre backstroke event at the 2018 FINA World Swimming Championships (25 m), in Hangzhou, China.

Ingrid Wilm swam for the LA Current team in the 2021 International Swimming League. Wilm was a post-draft signing by the LA Current and soon 
established herself as one of the leading backstrokers in the league. She won six of the eight 100 metre backstroke races she swam in and also picked 
up wins in the 50 and 200 metre backstroke and in the 50 metre Skins event. Wilm finished 11th on the season MVP list and was the top ranked woman on the LA Current team.

Wilm qualified for the Canadian team for the 2022 World Aquatics Championships, her first appearance at the World Championships, and reached the event final of the 50 m backstroke after coming fourth in the semi-finals. She finished fourth, 0.03 seconds behind bronze medalist Analia Pigrée of France. Wilm then competed the backstroke leg for Team Canada in the heats of the 4×100 m medley relay, helping the team qualify to the final in fourth position. She was replaced in the final by Kylie Masse, but shared in the team's bronze medal win.

Concluding the year at the 2022 World Swimming Championships in Melbourne, Wilm performed the backstroke leg for the Canadian team in the heats of the mixed 4×50 m medley. She was replaced by Masse in the final, and shared the team's bronze medal win. She claimed her first individual medal at the championship in the 100 m backstroke, tying for bronze with American Claire Curzan. On the last day of competition Wilm swam the backstroke leg for Canada in the final of the 4 × 100 metre medley relay and earned her third bronze medal of the championships.

References

External links
 

1998 births
Living people
Canadian female backstroke swimmers
Place of birth missing (living people)
Universiade medalists in swimming
Medalists at the 2019 Summer Universiade
World Aquatics Championships medalists in swimming
Medalists at the FINA World Swimming Championships (25 m)
21st-century Canadian women
Universiade bronze medalists for Canada